"Are the Good Times Really Over (I Wish a Buck Was Still Silver)" is a song written and recorded by American country music artist Merle Haggard backed by The Strangers.  It was released in May 1982 as the third single from his album Big City.  The song reached #2 on the Billboard Hot Country Singles chart and #1 on the RPM Country Tracks chart in Canada.

Content
The theme of the song is the concern over irreversible moral decay.

Charts

Weekly charts

Year-end charts

References

1982 singles
1981 songs
Merle Haggard songs
Songs written by Merle Haggard
Epic Records singles